Norma Jean Darden is a model recognized by the 2011 Huffington Post Game Changer Awards. The awards honored African American models featured in The Battle of Versailles Fashion Show which was a fashion show held on November 28, 1973, in the Palace of Versailles in Versailles, France. The fashion show was organized to raise money to restore the palace. Darden was among several models recognized, including Pat Cleveland, Bethann Hardison, Billie Blair, Alva Chin, Charlene Dash, Jennifer Brice, Barbara Jackson, China Machado, Ramona Saunders, and Amina Warsuma.

References

Living people
African-American female models
Year of birth missing (living people)
Place of birth missing (living people)
21st-century African-American people
21st-century African-American women